Jhor Mahankal is a village and former village development committee which is part of the Tokha municipality in Kathmandu District, Bagmati Province of central Nepal. It had a population of 4,103 in the 2011 Nepal census, with 873 households. Jhor Mahankal is known for Baruneshwar Gufa (Baruneshwar in Swosthani Katha) and its waterfalls. A number of clans live there, primarily the Adhikaris ("Officer" in English), Lamichanne, Dulals, Bidari, and Tamang.

Location 
Budhanilkantha is to the east, Sangla to the west, Shivapuri and Nuwakot District to the north, and Tokha Chandeshwori to the south.

Waterfall 
Jhor waterfall is popular with Kathmandu residents, particularly teenagers.

References

Populated places in Kathmandu District